John II (Spanish: Juan II, Catalan: Joan II, Aragonese: Chuan II and ; 29 June 1398 – 20 January 1479), called the Great (el Gran) or the Faithless (el Sense Fe), was King of Aragon from 1458 until his death in 1479. As the husband of Queen Blanche I of Navarre, he was King of Navarre from 1425 to 1479. John was also King of Sicily from 1458 to 1468.

Biography 

John was born at Medina del Campo (in the Crown of Castile), the son of King Ferdinand I of Aragon and Eleanor of Alburquerque. In his youth he was one of the infantes (princes) of Aragon who took part in the dissensions of Castile during the minority and reign of John II of Castile. Until middle life he was also lieutenant-general in Aragon for his brother and predecessor Alfonso V, whose reign was mainly spent in Italy. In his old age he was preoccupied by incessant conflicts with his Aragonese and Catalan subjects, with Louis XI of France, and in preparing the way for the marriage of his son Ferdinand with Isabella I of Castile which brought about the union of the crowns of Aragon and Castile and which was to create the Kingdom of Spain. His troubles with his subjects were closely connected with tragic dissensions within his own family.

John was first married to Blanche I of Navarre of the house of Évreux. By right of Blanche he became king of Navarre, and on her death in 1441 he was left in possession of the kingdom for his lifetime. But one son, Charles, given the title "Prince of Viana" as heir of Navarre, had been born of the marriage. John quickly came to regard this son with jealousy.  After his second marriage, to Juana Enríquez, it grew into absolute hatred, being encouraged by Juana. John tried to deprive his son of his constitutional right to act as lieutenant-general of Aragon during his father's absence. Charles's cause was taken up by the Aragonese, however, and the king's attempt to make his second wife lieutenant-general was set aside.

There followed the long Navarrese Civil War, with alternations of success and defeat, ending only with the death of the prince of Viana, possibly by poison administered by his father in 1461. The Catalans, who had adopted the cause of Charles and who had grievances of their own, called in a succession of foreign pretenders in the Catalan Civil War. John spent his last years contending with them. He was forced to pawn Roussillon, his possession on the north-east of the Pyrenees, to King Louis XI of France, who refused to part with it.

In his old age John was blinded by cataracts, but recovered his eyesight with an operation (couching) conducted by his physician Abiathar Crescas, a Jew. The Catalan revolt was pacified in 1472, but until his death in 1479 John carried on a war, in which he was generally unfortunate, with his neighbor the French king. He was succeeded by Ferdinand, his son by his second marriage, who was already married to Isabella I of Castile. With his death and son's accession to the throne of Aragon, the unification of Spain under one royal house began in earnest.

Marriages and issue
From his first marriage to Blanche of Navarre, John had the following children:
Charles, Prince of Viana (1421–1461)
Juana (142322 August 1425)
Blanche II of Navarre (1424–1464)
Eleanor of Navarre (1426-1479)

From his second marriage to Juana Enríquez, John had the following children:
Ferdinand II of Aragon (1452-1516). Married Isabella I of Castile.
Joanna of Aragon (1455–1517). Married Ferdinand I of Naples.

Illegitimate children:
 Alfonso de Aragón y de Escobar (1417-1495), Duke of Villahermosa
 Juan de Aragón (1440–1475), Archbishop of Zaragoza
 Felipe de Carrayos del Radona (Phillipe del Radona)

Ancestors

References

Sources 

120

Rivadeneyra. "Cronicas de los reyes de Castilla," Biblioteca de autores espanoles, vols. Ixvi, Ixviii. Madrid, 1845.
Zurita, G. Anales de Aragon. Saragossa, 1610.
Prescott W. H. History of the Reign of Ferdinand and Isabella. 1854.

External links

|-

|-

|-

|-

|-

|-

|-

|-

1397 births
1479 deaths
15th-century Aragonese monarchs
15th-century Kings of Sicily
15th-century Navarrese monarchs
People from Medina del Campo
House of Trastámara
Monarchs of Majorca
Valencian monarchs
Jure uxoris kings
Navarrese monarchs
Knights of the Golden Fleece
Counts of Barcelona
Aragonese infantes
Dukes of Montblanc
Dukes of Gandía
Burials at the Poblet Monastery
Counts of Malta